Emil P. Uremovich (September 26, 1916 – April 22, 1994) was an American football lineman for the Detroit Lions and for the Chicago Rockets in the National Football League.

References

1916 births
1994 deaths
Detroit Lions players
Indiana Hoosiers football players